Raphael Kazembe (born 24 March 1947) is a former Malawian cyclist. He competed in the individual road race at the 1972 Summer Olympics.

References

External links
 

1947 births
Living people
Malawian male cyclists
Olympic cyclists of Malawi
Cyclists at the 1972 Summer Olympics
Place of birth missing (living people)